Stokkvågen is a village and ferry port located in Lurøy Municipality in Nordland county, Norway. The port has ferries that connect the mainland to the islands of Onøya, Lovund, Sleneset/Moflag, and Træna to the west and to the town of Sandnessjøen to the south. The village of Stokkvågen is located along Norwegian County Road 17, along the Sjona fjord.

References

Ports and harbours of Norway
Geography of Nordland